The American science fiction television series Roswell ran between October 6, 1999, and May 14, 2002. The first two seasons aired on The WB, and the third and final season aired on UPN. The series follows the lives of teenage aliens, survivors of the 1947 UFO crash, hiding in plain sight as humans in Roswell, New Mexico.

Series overview

Episodes

Season 1 (1999–2000)

Season 2 (2000–01)

Season 3 (2001–02)

References

External links 
 

Lists of American science fiction television series episodes
Lists of American teen drama television series episodes
Roswell (TV series)